The 1852 United States presidential election in California was held on November 2, 1852, as part of the 1852 United States presidential election. Votes chose four representatives, or electors to the Electoral College, who voted for president and vice president.
 
California voted in its first ever presidential election, having become the 31st state on September 9, 1850. The state was won by the Democratic nominee, New Hampshire Senator Franklin Pierce, who defeated the Whig nominee, United States Army general Winfield Scott.

Pierce won the state by a margin of 6.19%.

Results

References

California
1852
1852 California elections